was a  after Eikyū and before Hōan. This period spanned the years from April 1118 through April 1120.

Change of Era
 January 24, 1118 : The new era name was created to mark an event or series of events. The previous era ended and the new one commenced in Eikyū 6, on the 3rd day of the 4th month of 1118.

Events of the Gen'ei Era
 1118 (Gen'ei 1, 9th month): The emperor made a pilgrimage to the Kumano Shrines in Wakayama. These Kumano sanzan are:  Hongu Taisha, Hayatama Taisha, and Nachi Taisha.
 1118 (Gen'ei 1, 12th month): Emperor Toba attended a festival organized by Saishō-ji. This temple had been established under the auspices of his Imperial patronage.
 1119 (Gen'ei 2, 8th month): Arihito, a Prince of the blood, was honored with the name Minamoto; and he was elevated to the 2nd rank of the 3rd class. Arihito's father, Sukehito-shinnō, was the third son of Emperor Go-Sanjō, and the younger brother of Emperor Toba. Arihito is said to have excelled in the arts of poetry.

Notes

References
 Brown, Delmer M. and Ichirō Ishida, eds. (1979).  Gukanshō: The Future and the Past. Berkeley: University of California Press. ;  OCLC 251325323
 Nussbaum, Louis-Frédéric and Käthe Roth. (2005).  Japan encyclopedia. Cambridge: Harvard University Press. ;  OCLC 58053128
 Titsingh, Isaac. (1834). Nihon Odai Ichiran; ou,  Annales des empereurs du Japon.  Paris: Royal Asiatic Society, Oriental Translation Fund of Great Britain and Ireland. OCLC 5850691
 Varley, H. Paul. (1980). A Chronicle of Gods and Sovereigns: Jinnō Shōtōki of Kitabatake Chikafusa. New York: Columbia University Press. ;  OCLC 6042764

External links
 National Diet Library, "The Japanese Calendar" -- historical overview plus illustrative images from library's collection

Japanese eras